{{Speciesbox
|image = Carabus marginalis.jpg
|image_caption =
|genus = Carabus
|species = marginalis
|authority = Fabricius, 1794
|synonyms =
Carabus chrysochlorus Fischer, 1812 "S-Russia & Siberia"Carabus decorus Seidlitz, 1891, nec Panzer, 1800
}}Carabus marginalis'' is a species of beetle from family Carabidae, found in Belarus, Germany, Italy, Moldova, Poland, Romania, Russia, and Ukraine.

References

marginalis
Beetles described in 1794